Asa may refer to:

People and fictional characters
 Asa (name), a given name, including a list of people and fictional characters so named
 Asa people, an ethnic group based in Tanzania
 Aṣa, Nigerian-French singer, songwriter, and recording artist Bukola Elemide (born 1982)
 Asa (rapper), Finnish rapper Matti Salo (born 1980)

Biblical and mythological figures
 Asa of Judah, third king of the Kingdom of Judah and the fifth king of the House of David
 Ása or Æsir, Norse gods

Places
 Asa, Hardoi Uttar Pradesh, India, a village
 Asu, South Khorasan, Iran, also spelled Asa, a village
 Asa, Kwara State, Nigeria, a local government area
 Asa River (Japan), a tributary of the Tama River in Tokyo, Japan
 Asa (Kazakhstan), a river
 Asa River (Venezuela) - see List of rivers in Venezuela

Other uses
 Asa (album), the sixth studio album by the German Viking metal band Falkenbach
 Asa (raga), a peculiar musical raga in Gurmat Sangeet tradition
 ASA carriage control characters, simple printing command characters used to control the movement of paper through line printers
 Asa language, spoken by the Asa people of Tanzania
 Asa Station, a railway station in San'yō-Onoda, Yamaguchi, Japan
 Asa (railway station), Jambyl Region, Kazakhstan
 Naboot, also called asa, a quarterstaff constructed of palm wood or rattan
 Asha, romanized as aṣ̌a, a Zoroastrian concept

See also
 ASA (disambiguation)
 Åsa (disambiguation)
 Aasa (disambiguation)
 Asia (disambiguation)
 Aza (disambiguation)